Prozac Nation is a 2001 psychological drama film directed by Erik Skjoldbjærg, starring Christina Ricci, Jason Biggs, Anne Heche, Michelle Williams, Jonathan Rhys Meyers, and Jessica Lange. It is based on Elizabeth Wurtzel's 1994 memoir of the same name, which describes Wurtzel's experiences with atypical depression. The title is a reference to Prozac, the brand name of an antidepressant she was prescribed.

Plot
Elizabeth "Lizzie" Wurtzel is a 19-year-old accepted into Harvard with a scholarship in journalism. She has been raised by her divorced mother since she was two years old and has not seen her father at all in the last four years. Despite his lack of interest and involvement, Lizzie still misses her father, a contributing factor to her depression. Through a series of flashbacks, it is clear that there was a total communication breakdown between Lizzie's parents, which is soon reflected in Lizzie's own relationship with her mother.

Soon after arriving at Harvard, Lizzie decides to lose her virginity to an older student, Noah. Lizzie proceeds to alienate Noah by throwing a loss-of-virginity party immediately afterwards with the help of her roommate Ruby. Although she and Lizzie begin as best friends, Ruby soon becomes another casualty of Lizzie's instability. Although Lizzie's article for the local music column in The Harvard Crimson is presented an award by Rolling Stone early into the semester, Lizzie soon finds herself unable to write, stuck in a vicious cycle with substance abuse. She begins a relationship with another student, Rafe, and visits his home in Texas. Upon discovering that his sister is severely autistic, Lizzie accuses Rafe of being 'a creepy voyeur' who gets off on witnessing the pain of others. Rafe breaks up with her.

Lizzie's promising literary career is at risk, as is her mental and physical health. Her mother sends her to expensive psychiatric sessions towards which her father, pleading poverty, implacably refuses to contribute anything at all. After a long period of treatment under medication and a suicidal gesture, Lizzie stabilizes and begins to adjust to her life.

Cast
 Christina Ricci as Elizabeth Wurtzel
 Zoe Miller as young Elizabeth Wurtzel
 Jason Biggs as Rafe
 Anne Heche as Dr. Sterling
 Michelle Williams as Ruby
 Jonathan Rhys Meyers as Noah
 Jessica Lange as Lynne Wurtzel
 Jesse Moss as Sam
 Nicholas Campbell as Donald Wurtzel, Elizabeth's father
 Lou Reed as himself

Release
The film had its world premiere at the Toronto International Film Festival on September 8, 2001 (three days before the 9/11 terrorist attack); distribution rights were acquired by Miramax Films with the intent of giving the film a wider theatrical release. Months of subsequent test screenings and re-edits of the film never led to a broad commercial release. The film was released in Norway, Skjoldbjærg's native country, in August 2003, but it never had a national release in the U.S. market. It premiered on the Starz! channel on March 19, 2005, and was released on DVD on July 5, 2005.

Frank Deasy, who co-wrote the screenplay, offered his opinion to The Guardian on Miramax's failure to release the film:

Reception
The film received generally negative reviews, scoring a 29% on the film aggregate site Rotten Tomatoes.

Soundtrack
What follows is a list of the songs that were played according to the end credits.

 "The Promise" – Bruce Springsteen
 "Mystery Achievement" – The Pretenders
 "I Will Dare" – The Replacements
 "Perfect Day" – Lou Reed
 "Sweet Jane" – Lou Reed
 "Keep the Promise" – The Pontiac Brothers
 "Ivory Tower" – The Long Ryders
 "Who Is Who" – Adolescents
 "The Real West" – Thin White Rope
 "Das Testament des Dr. Mabuse" – Propaganda

References

External links
 
 
 

2001 films
2001 drama films
2001 independent films
2000s English-language films
2000s psychological drama films
American psychological drama films
Eli Lilly and Company
Films about bipolar disorder
Films about depression
Films about virginity
Films based on memoirs
Films directed by Erik Skjoldbjærg
Films set in Harvard University
Films shot in Boston
Films shot in London
Films shot in New Jersey
Films shot in Vancouver
English-language German films
German psychological drama films
Films set in universities and colleges
2000s American films
2000s German films